Orthosia transparens is a species of cutworm or dart moth in the family Noctuidae.  It is found in North America.

The MONA or Hodges number for Orthosia transparens is 10479.

References

Further reading

 

Orthosia
Moths described in 1882